Antonio Longo (14 April 1742- 26 May 1820) was an Italian painter and priest in a late Baroque style.

Biography
Born to family of farmers in Varena in the Fiemme Valley of the province of Trento. He attended seminary in Trento, and ordained as a priest in 1766. He was vice-curato for the parish of Varena. His initial training was with a local painter of Val di Fiemme, Giuseppe Alberti. In Fiemme, he also profited from and later collaborated with Michelangelo and Cristoforo Unterberger. He also moved to Rome in 1780.

His religious duties limited his artistic endeavors. In Rome, he served as chaplain in the Convitto dell'Anima, and in part through Cristoforo Unterberger, who was Prince of the Accademia di San Luca, was able to befriend Anton Raphael Mengs and  Pompeo Battoni. Longo would soon join the Academy. In 1798, when Rome was occupied by Napoleonic armies, Longo as an Austrian citizen was forced to return to Varena, where he continued to paint.  Among his collaborators back in Val di Fiemme was Valentino Rovisi of Moena.

Longo also practiced architectural design, and designed the belltowers of the churches of San Sebastiano in Cavalese and Sant’Eliseo in Tesero. He painted an altarpiece of the Rosary for the church of Cavalese.

Among hisworks are frescoes for the Palazzo della Magnifica Comunità of Fiemme a Cavalese, paintings in the Museo Provinciale di Trento, and the Franciscan convents of  Cavalese and Cles. He painted sacred subjects for churches in Val di Fiemme and Val di Fassa, Aldeno, Agordo, Pergine Valsugana, Madrano (a degagna within Airolo), Riva del Garda, Salorno, Egna, Mezzolombardo, Mezzocorona, Margreid an der Weinstraße, Montalbiano (a frazione within Valfloriana), and Baselga di Pinè. He died in Varena.

Other sources
'Antonio Longo Pittore 1742-1820 (monograph), by Niccolo Rasmo, Verona, 1984.
Enciclopedia Treccani, Dizionario Biografico degli Italiani - Volume 65 (2005), entry by Chiara Felicetti.

References

1742 births
1820 deaths
People from Trentino
18th-century Italian painters
Italian male painters
19th-century Italian painters
19th-century Italian male artists
18th-century Italian male artists